Metuloidea cinnamomea is a species of tooth fungus in the family Steccherinaceae. Found in the Andes region of Venezuela, it was initially described in 2010 by Teresa Iturriaga and Leif Ryvarden as a species of Antrodiella. Otto Miettinen and Ryvarden transferred it to the newly created genus Metuloidea in 2016.

References

Fungi described in 2010
Fungi of Venezuela
Steccherinaceae
Taxa named by Leif Ryvarden